Charles de Bock (3 July 1914 – 19 February 1975) was a Dutch footballer. He played in one match for the Netherlands national football team in 1936.

References

External links
 

1914 births
1975 deaths
Dutch footballers
Netherlands international footballers
Place of birth missing
Association football midfielders